Lostock Gralam is a civil parish in Cheshire West and Chester, England. Other than the villages of Lostock Gralam and Lostock Green, the parish is entirely rural. It contains three buildings that are recorded in the National Heritage List for England as designated listed buildings, all of which are at Grade II. This is the lowest of the three grades, which contains "buildings of national importance and special interest". All three listed buildings are related to farming.

Buildings

See also
Listed buildings in Northwich
Listed buildings in Plumley
Listed buildings in Rudheath
Listed buildings in Wincham

References

Listed buildings in Cheshire West and Chester
Lists of listed buildings in Cheshire